Sheikh Rukn-ud-Din Abul Fateh (– ) was an eminent Punjabi Sufi saint from Multan in modern-day Pakistan who belonged to Suhrawardiyya Sufi order. He is commonly known by the title (Shah) Rukn-e-Alam ("Pillar of the World").

Biography 
Shah Rukne Alam was the son of Pir Sadar-Al-Din Arif. He was born in Multan on 26 November 1251 and died 3 January 1335. He was the grandson and successor of Sheikh Baha-ud-din Zakariya. He was buried in the mausoleum of his grandfather, according to his own willbut later, his coffin was transferred to the present mausoleum. Shah Rukn-e-Alam conferred his spiritual succession on Sufi sheikh Sultan Ul Tareeqin Sheikh Hameed ud Din Shah Hakim Al-Qureshi Asadi Al-Hashmi Suhrawardi. He is buried at Mau Mubarak in Rahim Yar Khan. He was Shah Rukn e Alam's Ataleeq-e-Awwal, Khalifa-e-Awwal and was married to the daughter of Sheikh Baha-ud-Din Zakariya.

Mausoleum
The saint is still revered today and his tomb is the focus of the pilgrimage of over 100,000 pilgrims yearly from all over South Asia. Shah Mehmood Qureshi is the current Sajjada Nashin and custodian of the Mausoleum of Shah Rukn-e-Alam.
The tomb was built between 1320 and 1324 CE in the pre-Mughal architectural style. The tomb is said to have built by Ghias-ud-Din Tughlak (r.1320-1325 AD) during his governorship of Depalpur, between 1320 and 1324 CE and was given by his son, Muhammad bin Tughluq to the descendants of Shah Rukn-e-Alam for the latter's burial in 1330. In the 1970s, the mausoleum was thoroughly repaired and renovated by the Auqaf Department. The entire glittering glazed interior is the result of new tiles and brickwork done by the Kashigars of Multan.

This tomb is on the tentative list as a UNESCO World Heritage Site.

Memorandum
Shah Rukan e Alam, named after the saint, is one of the autonomous towns of the city of Multan.
A daily train service, Shah Rukn-e-Alam Express, between Multan and Karachi was named after him.  It was suspended in February 2011 due to lack of locomotives.

See also
Baha-ud-din Zakariya
Qari Muhammad Muslehuddin Siddiqui
Suhrawardiyya

References

External links

Punjabi Sufis
People from Multan
1251 births
1335 deaths
Punjabi people